Istanbul Naval Shipyard, also known as Pendik Naval Shipyard,  is a naval shipyard of the Turkish Navy on the northeastern coast of the Sea of Marmara in Tuzla, Istanbul, Turkey. It is the largest shipbuilding facility in Turkey.

Right after the 1999 İzmit earthquake, which caused also heavy damage to the facilities of the Turkish Navy located in Gölcük, Kocaeli, the Navy Command decided to relocate the shipbuilding activities at the Gölcük Naval Shipyard to the Istanbul Naval Shipyard, leaving only the ship maintenance and reparation works there.

The drydock is serviced by one Kone portal crane with the lifting capacity of 450 tons. 

Ships built
RV Bilim-2, scientific research vessel
Turkish Navy
, Ada-class corvette
, Ada-class corvette
, Ada-class corvette
, Istanbul-class frigate
, Ada-class corvette
Pakistan Navy
, Babur-class heavy corvette

See also
 Gölcük Naval Shipyard

References and notes

Turkish Navy shipyards
Defence companies of Turkey
Military in Istanbul
Tuzla, Istanbul